I Hate Suzie is a British dark comedy-drama television series created by Lucy Prebble and Billie Piper. It was produced by Bad Wolf in association with Sky Studios, with Prebble serving as showrunner. All episodes were written by Prebble and most were directed by Georgi Banks-Davies while the second season was directed by Dawn Shadforth.

The show marks the third collaboration between Prebble and Piper, who previously worked together on Secret Diary of a Call Girl (2007–11) and The Effect (2012). I Hate Suzie follows the life of actress Suzie Pickles (Piper) whose life is thrown into turmoil when her phone is hacked and compromising photographs of her are leaked. Each episode is focused on "one of the eight stages of trauma" that Suzie experiences, a take on the five stages of grief.

I Hate Suzie premiered on Sky Atlantic and NOW TV on 27 August 2020. It made its US debut on HBO Max on 19 November. It received critical acclaim from television critics for its writing, directing, and Piper's performance. It was recognised by several publications as one of the best television programmes of the year. On 19 February 2021, it was renewed for a second series, titled I Hate Suzie Too, which premiered on Sky Atlantic on 20 December 2022.

Premise
Suzie Pickles (Piper) is a former teenage pop star and television actress. After her phone is hacked and compromising photos of her are leaked, Suzie struggles to keep her marriage to Cob (Daniel Ings) together and protect her deaf son Frank (Matthew Jordan-Caws). Meanwhile, Naomi (Leila Farzad), Suzie's manager and friend, attempts to keep her career afloat.

Cast and characters
Billie Piper as Suzie Pickles
Leila Farzad as Naomi Jones
Daniel Ings as Cob Betterton
Nathaniel Martello-White as Carter Vaughan
Matthew Jordan-Caws as Frank
Emma Smithin as Young Suzie
Layton Williams as Adam Jackson (series 2)

Episodes

Series overview

Season 1 (2020)

Season 2 (2022): I Hate Suzie Too

Production

Conception
Following their collaboration on Secret Diary of a Call Girl and The Effect, Prebble and Piper developed a close friendship. Piper expressed interest to Prebble in working together on another project. The inspiration for the story came from the frequent correspondence between the two, who would share their struggles of identity and womanhood. Prebble came up with the idea for a story centered around a phone hack. She structured the story around an idea of "eight stages of trauma or grief", a take on the five stages of grief, with each episode focusing on one of the stages. Each episode was created to have the feel of a standalone mini-film.

Filming
Interior scenes for I Hate Suzie were filmed entirely on location in and around London. Some exterior scenes were shot on-location at Park Avenue and Mimms Hall Road in the town Potters Bar, Hertfordshire. For the episode "Denial", scenes featuring Suzie and Naomi at a sci-fi convention were filmed at the ExCeL London during the MCM London Comic Con in October 2019.

Music
The musical score to I Hate Suzie was composed by Johnny Lloyd and Nathan Coen, who previously worked with Piper on her directorial debut Rare Beasts. "Before we even knew what the series was gonna look like, we were already kind of pulling together ideas and sending them to Lucy [Prebble] while she was writing it," Coen said. Lloyd described the process of scoring as "challenging" to create continuity and embody different emotions each episode.

Broadcast
I Hate Suzie premiered on Sky Atlantic on 27 August 2020, with all episodes made available to watch on Sky's NOW TV subscription service that same day. The following day, it was made available in Australia on the streaming service Stan. In October 2020, the show was acquired for American audiences by HBO Max. The series had its US television debut on HBO Max on 19 November. In Latin America the series premiered on 7 November 2020 on Warner TV. On 9 September 2021, it was made available in Brazil on the streaming service Globoplay.

Reception

Ratings
The premiere episode "Shock" received an overnight rating of 95,000 viewers across two screenings. After seven days, the ratings rose to 532,000. Twenty-eight days later, the episode's ratings rose to a total of 987,000 viewers, including 41,000 watching from other devices. The show became Sky Atlantic's second most-viewed show for the third quarter of 2020, behind the miniseries The Third Day.

Critical reception

I Hate Suzie was acclaimed by television critics, who praised the writing and Piper's performance. The review aggregator website Rotten Tomatoes reported an approval rating of 95% with an average score of 8.1/10, based on 37 reviews. The website's critical consensus reads, "Gazing into the eye of the celebrity storm with frenzied style, I Hate Suzie is a ruthless satire on stardom that is effortlessly carried by Billie Piper's manic performance." Metacritic, which uses a weighted average, assigned the first season a score of 85 out of 100 based on 11 critics, indicating "Universal acclaim".

Writing for The Telegraph, Chris Bennion gave the show 5 out of 5 stars, stating "I Hate Suzie is a glorious mess of ideas, a potent, fizzing monument to the creativity of its makers." Lucy Mangan of The Guardian praised the collaboration between Prebble and Piper, calling the show a "wild ride that feels like an absolute gift." Kristen Baldwin in her review for Entertainment Weekly gave the series an "A" rating, calling it a "bloody brilliant exploration of modern womanhood" that "tells a wholly unique story about the liberation that comes from total exposure."
   
Sonia Saraiya of Vanity Fair wrote, "I Hate Suzie is a masterclass in tone... a portrait of vulnerability that bewitches not by prettifying itself, or making itself ugly, but instead with stark, unfiltered honesty." Ed Cumming of The Independent wrote, "Piper has a rare gift for eliciting sympathy... [w]hat emerges is a black-comedy-horror about female friendship, modern fame, and the impossibility of true privacy in a world where everyone has an online video camera in their pockets."
 
In a more critical review, Allison Keene of Paste deemed the series "messy, ambitious, chic, yet ultimately a little shallow and out of focus." However, she reserved praise for Piper's acting, calling her performance "astonishingly open". Matt Walsh of TV Guide wrote: "You might squirm but will never hate the excellent Piper, as Suzie careens from self-pity to self-disgust in a surreal blur of debauched despair." Writing for Decider, Joel Keller found the first episode to be "an effective exercise in seeing a person's life fall apart around them in short order" but was more "intrigued with seeing Piper's interpretation of how Suzie tries to put the pieces back together."

Accolades

I Hate Suzie appeared on several critics year-end top ten lists:

 2nd Allison Shoemaker, The A.V. Club
 2nd Hannah Jane Parkinson, The Guardian
 4th Chris Bennion, The Telegraph 5th Kristen Baldwin, Entertainment Weekly 6th Staff, GQ UK 6th Staff, NME
 7th Jeanne Jakle, San Antonio Express-News 9th Brian Donaldson, The List 10th Staff,  Empire 10th Staff, Total Film 13th Staff, RogerEbert.com
 15th Staff, Thrillist
 19th Staff, Den of Geek
 Best New Shows (not ranked) – CNET
 Top 10 (not ranked) – Naomi Gordon, Harper's Bazaar Top 13 (not ranked) – Caroline Framke, Variety Top 20 (not ranked) – Staff, Evening Standard''

References

External links
 
 

2020 British television series debuts
2020s British comedy-drama television series
2020s British comedy television series
English-language television shows
Sky Atlantic original programming
Television series about actors
Television series about social media
Television series created by Lucy Prebble